N-acetyl-1-D-myo-inositol-2-amino-2-deoxy-alpha-D-glucopyranoside deacetylase (MshB) is an enzyme with systematic name 1-(2-acetamido-2-deoxy-alpha-D-glucopyranosyl)-1D-myo-inositol acetylhydrolase. This enzyme catalyses the following chemical reaction

 1-(2-acetamido-2-deoxy-alpha-D-glucopyranosyl)-1D-myo-inositol + H2O  1-(2-amino-2-deoxy-alpha-D-glucopyranoside)-1D-myo-inositol + acetate

This enzyme mediates the rate limiting step in the mycothiol biosynthesis pathway.

References

External links 
 

EC 3.5.1